The 24th Grand Prix des Frontières was a non-championship Formula One motor race held on 6 June 1954 at the Chimay Street Circuit in Chimay, Belgium. The Grand Prix was won by B. Bira in a Maserati A6GCM. André Pilette finished second in a Gordini T16 and Don Beauman was third in a Connaught Type A-Lea Francis. Jacques Pollet took pole and fastest lap in another Gordini T16.

During the race Pollet crashed while avoiding the spinning Pilette and two spectators were killed.

Classification

Race

References

Grand Prix des Frontières
Frontières
Frontières
Frontières